Don H. Catlin (born June 4, 1938) is an anti-doping scientist and one of the founders of modern drug-testing in sport.

Career
Catlin has overseen testing for performance-enhancing drugs at the three most recent Olympics held in the United States since the 1984 Summer Games in Los Angeles, as well as testing for the United States Olympic Committee, the National Collegiate Athletic Association (NCAA), Major League Baseball's minor leagues and the National Football League (NFL).  He has also developed drug identification techniques currently in use at the Olympic, professional and collegiate levels.

In 1982, Catlin founded the UCLA Olympic Analytical Laboratory, the first anti-doping lab in the United States and now the world's largest testing facility of performance-enhancing drugs.  He remained the lab's director for 25 years.

Catlin currently serves as president and CEO of the Los Angeles-based NGO Anti-Doping Research, Inc. (ADR).  The organization was founded in 2005 to bolster efforts to uncover new drugs being used illegally by competitors and develop the tests to detect them. It also advocates for and establishes programs to encourage athletes at all levels not to use performance-enhancing drugs.

In addition, he heads the companies Anti-Doping Sciences Institute (ADSI) and Banned Substances Control Group (BSCG).

In a peer-reviewed article in the August 2009 issue of the quarterly scientific journal, Comparative Exercise Physiology, Catlin and his colleagues at ADR report that they developed an equine test for powerful blood-boosting drug CERA.  ADR is currently working to develop an effective urine test to detect human growth hormone (hGH) – one of the most sought-after tests by sports leagues worldwide.  (See Mitchell Report (baseball).)

Catlin is Professor Emeritus of Molecular and Medical Pharmacology at the UCLA David Geffen School of Medicine. He also serves as chairman of the Equine Drug Research Institute's Scientific Advisory Committee and as a member of the Federation Equestre Internationale Commission on Equine Anti-Doping & Medication.  Since 1988, he has been a member of the International Olympic Committee Medical Commission.

The Chicago Tribune named Catlin Sportsman of the Year for 2002.

Major discoveries

 In the 1990s, Catlin began to offer the carbon isotope ratio test, a urine test that determines whether anabolic steroids are made naturally by the body or come from a prohibited performance-enhancing drug.
 In 2002 at the Winter Olympics in Salt Lake City, he reported darbepoetin alfa, a form of the blood booster EPO (erythropoietin), for the first time in sports.
 Also in 2002, he identified norbolethone, the first reported designer anabolic steroid used by an athlete.
 In 2003, as part of the investigation of BALCO, he identified and developed a test for tetrahydrogestrinone (THG) or "The Clear," the second reported designer anabolic steroid.  In November 2009, 'Newsweek' named Trevor Graham's decision to send a syringe containing the substance to the United States Anti-Doping Agency (USADA) (which then passed it on to Catlin for analysis) as one of the decade's Top-10 History-Altering Decisions.
 In 2004, Catlin identified madol, the third reported designer anabolic steroid, also known as DMT, and since 2004 he and his team have identified several more designer steroids.
 In 2006, he received a request from The Washington Post to analyse a dietary supplement created by Patrick Arnold which contained an amphetamine-like substance and he identified the active ingredient as methylhexaneamine. The substance was added to the WADA banned list in 2009.
 In 2009, he and his team at Anti-Doping Research developed an equine test for the potent blood-boosting drug CERA, short for the brand name Mircera; also known as Continuous erythropoietin receptor activator.

Personal life
His wife, Bernadette, a French-Belgian nurse he met at UCLA, died of melanoma in 1989.   He has two sons: Bryce Catlin, a software engineer who is married and living in the Bay Area in California, and Oliver Catlin, vice president and CFO of Anti-Doping Research in Los Angeles. He is featured in the documentary film Icarus (2017 film), where he introduced the American producer Bryan Fogel to the Russian scientist Grigory Rodchenkov; the subsequent events helped expose the Russian doping scandal.

See also
World Anti-Doping Agency
Erythropoietin
Norbolethone
Tetrahydrogestrinone
Bay Area Laboratory Co-operative
Use of performance-enhancing drugs in sport
Mitchell Report (baseball)
Continuous erythropoietin receptor activator

References

External links
Anti-Doping Research (ADR)
Anti-Doping Sciences Institute (ADSI)
Banned Substances Control Group (BSCG)

1938 births
Living people
American social scientists
David Geffen School of Medicine at UCLA faculty
American health care chief executives